Ashwin Yadav (10 September 1987 – 24 April 2021) was an Indian cricketer. He played fourteen first-class matches for Hyderabad between 2007 and 2009.

Yadav died of heart attack on 24 April 2021, at the age of 33.

See also
 List of Hyderabad cricketers

References

External links
 

1987 births
2021 deaths
Indian cricketers
Hyderabad cricketers
Cricketers from Hyderabad, India
Place of death missing